Kairat Yeraliyev (Qairat Eräliev; born 8 November 1990) is a Kazakh boxer who competes in the bantamweight division. He won bronze medals at the 2013 World Championships and 2014 Asian Games, but was eliminated in the second bout at the 2016 Summer Olympics.

Career
At the 2013 AIBA World Boxing Championships in Almaty, he beat Nicolae Andreiana, Omurbek Malabekov and Olympic Champion Robeisy Ramírez. In the semifinals losing to Javid Chalabiyev of Azerbaijan.

At the 2014 Asian Games in Incheon, he beat Othman Arbabi, Mohammad Al-Wadi. In the semifinals losing to Ham Sang-myeong of South Korea.

He won the bronze medal at the men's bantamweight event at the  2015 Asian Amateur Boxing Championships.

In the 2016 Summer Olympics, he beat first bout to Javid Chalabiyev. In the second bout losing to Murodjon Akhmadaliev of Uzbekistan in the men's bantamweight class.

He won the bronze medal at the men's bantamweight event at the  2017 Asian Amateur Boxing Championships.

Kairat started the 2017 AIBA World Boxing Championships with 5-0 wins over Christopher Florez of the Mexico in the first round, and 4-1 Murodjon Akhmadaliev of Uzbekistan in the second round. In quarterfinals Yeraliyev wins 5-0 Omar El-Hag of Germany and semifinals he wins Peter McGrail of England and advanced to the final. In the final, Kairat Yeraliyev fight Duke Ragan of United States and gave the victory 3-2 and the gold medal.

References

External links 

 
 
 
 

Living people
1990 births
People from Shymkent
Kazakhstani male boxers
Boxers at the 2016 Summer Olympics
Olympic boxers of Kazakhstan
Boxers at the 2014 Asian Games
Boxers at the 2018 Asian Games
Asian Games bronze medalists for Kazakhstan
Asian Games medalists in boxing
Medalists at the 2014 Asian Games
AIBA World Boxing Championships medalists
World boxing champions
Bantamweight boxers